The Wagner Falls Scenic Site is a Michigan State Park, located  in central Alger County, Upper Michigan. The 23-acre (0.1 km²) state scenic area protects Wagner Falls.

Geography
It is operated by the Michigan Department of Natural Resources.

Wagner Falls
Wagner Falls is a cascade created by Wagner Creek as it falls over a stratum of erosion-resistant dolomite.
 
The creek drops into a shallow gorge containing the Anna River.  The Anna River then flows northward into Lake Superior.

References

External links
 Michigan Department of Natural Resources — Wagner Falls Scenic Site

State parks of Michigan
Protected areas of Alger County, Michigan